Vivek Velmurugan known by his stage name Vivek is an Indian lyricist working on Tamil language films. After making his debut in Enakkul Oruvan (2015), he received critical acclaim for his work in 36 Vayadhinile (2015), Jil Jung Juk (2016), Mersal (2017), Sarkar (2018), Petta (2019), Bigil (2019) and Jagame Thandhiram (2021) . His songs "Aalaporan Thamizhan", "Marana Mass", "Verithanam" , "Tum Tum" and "Ranjithame" hit 100 million views on Youtube.Vivek has worked on over 175+ songs.

Career
After studying Civil engineering and then practising law, Vivek began writing poems after being inspired by the works of Vairamuthu. Vivek made his debut as lyricist through Enakkul Oruvan (2015), where he wrote two songs for the film's album, under the instructions of composer Santhosh Narayanan. The pair have subsequently collaborated in several projects including 36 Vayadhinile (2015), for which Vivek received a Best Lyricist nomination for at the 1st IIFA Utsavam, and in the sports drama film, Irudhi Suttru (2016). Vivek also garnered attention for his lyrics in "Shoot The Kuruvi", the promotional song from Siddharth's Jil Jung Juk (2016).

Filmography

References

External links 

Tamil film poets
Tamil-language lyricists
Living people
Indian Tamil people
People from Cuddalore district
1985 births